Barela Rock is a rock outcrop in the southern part of Przybyszewski Island in the Marshall Archipelago. It was mapped by the United States Geological Survey from surveys and from U.S. Navy air photos, 1959–65, and named by the Advisory Committee on Antarctic Names for Ruben E. Barela, aviation structural mechanic, U.S. Navy, of the McMurdo Station party, 1967.

References
 

Rock formations of Marie Byrd Land